Stromer is a surname. Notable persons with the name include:

Del Stromer (1930–2003), American politician
Eric Stromer (born 1961), American actor  and television host
Ernst Stromer (1871–1952), German paleontologist
Heinrich Stromer (died 1542), German physician
Ulman Stromer (1329–1407), German trader, factory owner and city councillor

See also 
Stroma (disambiguation)